The Western Satraps, or Western Kshatrapas (Brahmi:, Mahakṣatrapa, "Great Satraps") were Indo-Scythian (Saka) rulers of the western and central part of India (Saurashtra and Malwa: modern Gujarat, Maharashtra, Rajasthan and Madhya Pradesh states), between 35 to 415 CE. The Western Satraps were contemporaneous with the Kushans who ruled the northern part of the Indian subcontinent, and were possibly vassals of the Kushans. They were also contemporaneous with the Satavahana (Andhra) who ruled in Central India. They are called "Western Satraps" in modern historiography in order to differentiate them from the "Northern Satraps", who ruled in Punjab and Mathura until the 2nd century CE.

The power of the Western Satraps started to decline in the 2nd century CE after the Saka rulers were defeated by the Emperor Gautamiputra Satakarni of the Satavahana dynasty. After this, the Saka kingdom revived, but was ultimately destroyed by Chandragupta II of the Gupta Empire in the 4th century CE. The western Satraps, having been defeated by the Abhiras/Ahirs, declined rapidly during the second half of the third century.

Altogether, there were 27 independent Western Satrap rulers during a period of about 350 years.

Name
 
They are named Western Satraps in contrast to the "Northern Satraps" who ruled around East Punjab and the area of Mathura, such as Rajuvula, and his successors under the Kushans, the "Great Satrap" Kharapallana and the "Satrap" Vanaspara.

Although they called themselves "Satraps" on their coins, leading to their modern designation of "Western Satraps", Ptolemy in his 2nd century "Geographia" still called them "Indo-Scythians". The word  has the same origin as the word satrap and are both descended from Median , which means viceroy or governor of a province, and according to John Marshall, the word  means the viceroy of the "King of kings". The western Kshatrapas were also known as Sakas to Indians.

The title  by which the Western Satraps styled themselves is a derivation of a Saka language term , meaning "lord of the country", and was likely the Saka synonym for the Indian title , which had itself been borrowed from the Iranian Median language.

The Sakas of Western India spoke the Saka language, also known as Khotanese as it is first attested in the Tarim Basin.

First expansion: Kshaharata dynasty (1st century CE)

The Western Satraps are thought to have started with the rather short-lived Kshaharata dynasty (also called Chaharada, Khaharata or Khakharata depending on sources). The term Kshaharata is also known from the 6 CE Taxila copper plate inscription, in which it qualifies the Indo-Scythian ruler Liaka Kusulaka. The Nasik inscription of the 19th year of Sri Pulamavi also mentions the Khakharatavasa, or Kshaharata race.

The earliest Kshaharata for whom there is evidence is Abhiraka, whose rare coins are known. He was succeeded by Bhumaka, father of Nahapana, who only used on his coins the title of Satrap, and not that of Raja or Raño (king). Nahapana's rule is variously dated to 24-70 CE, 66-71 CE, or 119–124 CE, according to one of his coins, which bear Buddhist symbols, such as the eight-spoked wheel (dharmachakra), or the lion seated on a capital, a representation of a pillar of Ashoka.

Nahapana succeeded him, and became a very powerful ruler. He occupied portions of the Satavahana Empire in western and central India. Nahapana held sway over Malwa, Southern Gujarat, and Northern Konkan, from Bharuch to Sopara and the Nasik and Poona districts. At that time, the area northwest of the Western Satraps in Baluchistan was ruled by the Paratarajas, an Indo-Parthian polity, while the Kushans were expanding their empire in the North.

His son-in-law, the Saka Ushavadata (married to his daughter Dakshamitra), is known from inscriptions in Nasik and Karle and Junnar (Manmodi Caves, inscription of the year 46) to have been viceroy of Nahapana, ruling over the southern part of his territory.

Nahapana established the silver coinage of the Kshatrapas.

Circa 120 CE, the Western Satraps are known to have allied with the Uttamabhadras in order to repulse an attack by the Malavas, whom they finally crushed. The claim appears in an inscription at the Nashik Caves, made by the Nahapana's viceroy Ushavadata:

Support of Indian religions
An important inscription related to Nahapana in the Great Chaitya at Karla Caves shows his support of Buddhism and Hinduism:

Construction of Buddhist caves
The Western Satraps are known for the construction and dedication of numerous Buddhist caves in Central India, particularly in Maharashtra and Gujarat. It is thought that Nahapana ruled at least 35 years in the region of Karla, Junnar and Nasik, giving him ample time for construction work there.

Numerous inscriptions in the caves are known, which were made by the family of Nahapana: six inscriptions in Nasik Caves, one inscription at Karla Caves, and one by Nahapana's minister in the Manmodi Caves at Junnar. At the same time, "Yavanas", Greeks or Indo-Greeks, also left donative inscriptions at the Nasik Caves, Karla Caves, Lenyadri and Manmodi Caves.

Great Chaitya hall at Karla Caves

In particular, the chaitya cave complex of the Karla Caves, the largest in South Asia, was constructed and dedicated in 120 CE by the Western Satraps ruler Nahapana.

Cave No.10 of Nasik, the 'Nahapana Vihara'

Parts of the Nasik Caves, also called Pandavleni Caves, were also carved during the time of Nahapana.

The inscriptions of cave no.10 in the Nasik Caves near Nasik, reveal that in 105-106 CE, Kshatrapas defeated the Satavahanas after which Kshatrapa Nahapana’s son-in-law and Dinika's son- Ushavadata donated 3000 gold coins for this cave as well as for the food and clothing of the monks. Usabhdatta's wife (Nahapana's daughter), Dakshmitra also donated one cave for the Buddhist monks. Cave 10 - 'Nahapana Vihara' is spacious with 16 rooms.

Two inscriptions in Cave 10 mention the building and the gift of the whole cave to the Samgha by Ushavadata, the Saka son-in-law and viceroy of Nahapana:

 

According to the inscriptions, Ushavadata accomplished various charities and conquests on behalf of his father-in-law. He constructed rest-houses, gardens and tanks at Bharukachchha (Broach), Dashapura (Mandasor in Malva), Govardhana (near Nasik) and Shorparaga (Sopara in the Thana district).

Junnar dedication
A dedication in the Lenyadri complex of the Junnar caves (inscription No. 26 in Cave VI of the Bhimasankar group of caves), mentions a gift by Nahapana's prime minister Ayama in the "year 46":

This inscription, the last one of the reign of Nahapana, suggests that Nahapana may have become an independent ruler since he is described as a King.

International trade: the Periplus of the Erythraean Sea
Nahapana is mentioned in the Periplus of the Erythraean Sea under the name Nambanus, as ruler of the area around Barigaza:

Under the Western Satraps, Barigaza was one of the main centers of Roman trade with India. The Periplus describes the many goods exchanged:

Goods were also brought down in quantity from Ujjain, the capital of the Western Satraps:

Some ships were also fitted out from Barigaza, to export goods westward across the Indian Ocean:

Pompei Lakshmi
An Indian statuette, the Pompeii Lakshmi, was found in the ruins of Pompei and is thought to have been the result of Indo-Roman trade relations in the 1st century CE. There is a possibility that the statuette found its way to the west during the rule of Western Satrap Nahapana in the Bhokardan area, and was shipped to Rome from the port of Barigaza.

Defeat by Gautamiputra Satakarni

Nahapana and Ushavadata were ultimately defeated by the powerful Satavahana king Gautamiputra Satakarni. Gautamiputra drove the Sakas from Malwa and Western Maharashtra, forcing Nahapana west to Gujarat. His victory is known from the fact that Gautamiputra restruck many of Nahapana's coins (such a hoard was found in Jogalthambi, Nashik District),) and that he claimed victory on them in an inscription at Cave No. 3 of the Pandavleni Caves in Nashik:

Colonization of Java and Sumatra
It seems that the Indian colonization of the islands of Java and Sumatra took place during the time of the Western Satraps. People may have fled the sub-continent due to the conflicts there. Some foundation legends of Java describe the leader of the colonists as Aji Saka, a prince from Gujarat, at the beginning of the Shaka era (which is also the Java era).

Kardamaka dynasty, family of Castana (1st–4th century)

A new dynasty, called the Bhadramukhas or Kardamaka dynasty, was established by the "Satrap" Castana. The date of Castana is not certain, but many believe his reign started in the year 78 CE, thus making him the founder of the Saka era. This is consistent with the fact that his descendants (who we know used the Saka era on their coins and inscriptions) would use the date of their founder as their era. Castana was satrap of Ujjain during that period. A statue found in Mathura together with statues of the Kushan king Kanishka and Vima Taktu, and bearing the name "Shastana" is often attributed to Castana himself, and suggests Castana may have been a feudatory of the Kushans. Conversely, the Rabatak inscription also claims Kushan dominion over Western Satrap territory (by mentioning Kushan control over the capital Ujjain) during the reign of Kanishka (c. 127–150 CE).

Territory under Chastana

The territory of the Western Satraps at the time of Chastana is described extensively by the geographer Ptolemy in his "Geographia", where he qualifies them as "Indo-Scythians". He describes this territory as starting from Patalene in the West, to Ujjain in the east ("Ozena-Regia Tiastani", "Ozene/Ujjain, capital of king Chastana"), and beyond Barigaza in the south.

Rudradaman I (130-150 CE)

Victory against the Satavahanas

Around 130 CE, Rudradaman I, grandson of Chastana, took the title "Mahakshatrapa" ("Great Satrap"), and defended his kingdom from the Satavahanas. The conflict between Rudradaman and Satavahanas became so gruelling, that in order to contain the conflict, a matrimonial relationship was concluded by giving Rudradaman's daughter to the Satavahana king Vashishtiputra Satakarni. The inscription relating the marriage between Rudradaman's daughter and Vashishtiputra Satakarni appears in a cave at Kanheri:

The Satavahanas and the Western Satraps remained at war however, and Rudradaman I defeated the Satavahanas twice in these conflicts, only sparing the life of Vashishtiputra Satakarni due to their family alliance:

Rudradaman regained all the previous territories held by Nahapana, probably with the exception of the southern areas of Poona and Nasik (epigraphical remains in these two areas at that time are exclusively Satavahana):

Victory against the Yaudheyas
Later, the Junagadh rock inscription (c. 150 CE) of Rudradaman I acknowledged the military might of the Yaudheyas "who would not submit  because they were proud of their title 'heroes among the Kshatriyas'", before explaining that they were ultimately vanquished by Rudradaman I.

Recently discovered pillar inscriptions describe the presence of a Western Satrap named Rupiamma in the Bhandara district of the area of Vidarbha, in the extreme northeastern area of Maharashtra, where he erected the pillars.

Rudradarman is known for his sponsoring of the arts. He is known to have written poetry in the purest of Sanskrit, and made it his court language. His name is forever attached to the inscription by Sudharshini lake.

He had at his court a Greek writer named Yavanesvara ("Lord of the Greeks"), who translated from Greek to Sanskrit the Yavanajataka ("Saying of the Greeks"), an astrological treatise and India's earliest Sanskrit work in horoscopy.

Jivadaman (178-181 CE, 197-198 CE)

King Jivadaman became king for the centenary of the Saka Era, in the year 100 (corresponding to 178 CE). His reign is otherwise undocumented, but he is the first Western Satrap ruler who started to print the minting date on his coins, using the Brāhmī numerals of the Brāhmī script behind the king's head. This is of immense value to date precisely Western Satrap rulers, and to clarify perfectly the chronology and succession between them, as they also mention their predecessor on their coins. According to his coins, Jivadaman seems to have ruled two times, once between Saka Era 100 and 103 (178-181 CE), before the rule of Rudrasimha I, and once between Saka Era 119 and 120 (197-198 CE).

Rudrasimha I (180-197)
[[File:Western Satrap Coin of Rudrasimha I .jpg|thumb|250px|Coin of the Western Kshatrapa ruler Rudrasimha I (178–197).
Obv: Bust of Rudrasimha, with corrupted Greek legend "..OHIIOIH.." (Indo-Greek style).
Rev: Three-arched hill or Chaitya, with river, crescent and sun, within Prakrit legend in Brahmi script:
An inscription of Rudrasimha I (178-197) was recently found at Setkhedi in Shajapur district, dated to 107 Saka Era, that is 185 CE, confirming the expansion of the Western Satraps to the east at that date. There is also an earlier inscription related to Saka rule in Ujjain, as well as a later one, the Kanakerha inscription, related to Saka rule in the area of Vidisha, Sanchi and Eran in the early 4th century.

Great Satrap Rupiamma (2nd century CE)

A memorial pillar with an inscription in the name of "Mahakshatrapa Kumara Rupiamma" has been recovered in Pauni in the central region of Vidharba, and is dated to the 2nd century CE. Although this Great Satrap is not otherwise known from coinage, this memorial pillar is thought to mark the southern extent of the conquests of the Western Satraps, much beyond the traditionally held boundary of the Narmada River. The use of the word "Kumara" may also mean that Rupiamma was the son of a Great Satrap, rather than holding the title himself.

Loss of southern territories to the Satavahanas (end of 2nd century CE)
The south Indian ruler Yajna Sri Satakarni (170-199 CE) of the Satavahana dynasty defeated the Western Satraps in the late 2nd century CE, thereby reconquering their southern regions in western and central India, which led to the decline of the Western Satraps.

Yajna Sri Satakarni left inscriptions in Nasik Caves, Kanheri and Guntur, testifying to the renewed extent of Satavahana territory. There are two inscriptions of Yajna Sri Satakarni at Kanheri, in cave No. 81, and in the Chaitya cave No. 3. In the Nasik Caves, there is one inscription of Sri Yajna Satakarni, in the 7th year of his reign.

There is a possibility, however, that the areas of Poona and Nasik had remained in the hands of the Satavahanas since the time of Gautamiputra Satakarni after his victory over Nahapana, as there are no epigraphical records of the Kardamakas in this area.

Rudrasena II (256–278)

The Kshatrapa dynasty seems to have reached a high level of prosperity under the rule of Rudrasena II (256–278), 19th ruler of Kshatrapa.

A marital alliance between the Andhra Ikshvaku and the Western Satraps seems to have occurred during the time of Rudrasena II, as the Andhra Ikshvaku ruler Māṭharīputra Vīrapuruṣadatta (250-275 CE) seems to have had as one of his wives Rudradhara-bhattarika, the daughter of "the ruler of Ujjain", possibly king Rudrasena II. According to an inscription at Nagarjunakonda, Iksvaku king Virapurushadatta had multiple wives, including Rudradhara-bhattarika, the daughter of the ruler of Ujjain (Uj(e)nika mahara(ja) balika).

The region of Sanchi-Vidisha was again captured from the Satavahanas during the rule of Rudrasena II (255-278 CE), as shown by finds of Rudrasena II's coinage in the area. The region would then remain under Western Satrap rule until the 4th century CE, as attested by the Kanakerha inscription.

The last Kshatrapa ruler of the Chastana family was Visvasena (Vishwasen, r.293–304 CE), brother and successor to Bhartrdaman and son of Rudrasena II. A coin of Visvasena was found in excavations at the Ajanta Caves, in the burnt-brick monastery facing the caves on the right bank of the river Waghora.

Rudrasimha II dynasty (c. 304–396 CE) 

A new family took over, started by the rule of Rudrasimha II (r. 304–348 CE). He declared on his coins to be the son of a Lord (Svami) Jivadaman. His rule is partly coeval with that of other rulers, who were his sons as written on their coins and may have been sub-kings: Yasodaman II (r. 317–332 CE) and Rudradaman II (r. 332–348 CE).

Contributions to Buddhism
Under Rudrasimha II, the Western Satraps are known to have maintained their presence in the Central Indian areas of Vidisha/Sanchi/Eran well into the 4th century: during his rule, in 319 CE, a Saka ruler inscribed the Kanakerha inscription, on the hill of Sanchi mentioning the construction of a well by the Saka chief and "righteous conqueror" (dharmaviyagi mahadandanayaka) Sridharavarman (339-368 CE). Another inscription of the same Sridhavarman with his military commander is known from Eran. These inscriptions point to the extent of Saka rule as of the time of Rudrasimha II.

The construction of Buddhist monuments in the area of Gujarat during the later part of Western Satrap rule is attested with the site of Devnimori, which incorporates viharas and a stupa. Coins of Rudrasimha were found inside the Buddhist stupa of Devnimori. The Buddha images in Devnimori clearly show the influence of the Greco-Buddhist art of Gandhara, and have been described as examples of the Western Indian art of the Western Satraps. It has been suggested that the art of Devnimori represented a Western Indian artistic tradition that was anterior to the rise of Gupta Empire art, and that it may have influenced not only the latter, but also the art of the Ajanta Caves, Sarnath and other places from the 5th century onward.

Overall, the Western Satraps may have played a role in the transmission of the art of Gandhara to the western Deccan region.

Sasanian expansion in the northwest

After a period of control of the areas as far as Gandhara by the Kushano-Sasanians, the Sasanian Empire further expanded into the northwest of the subcontinent, particularly in the regions of Gandhara and Punjab, from the time of Shapur II circa 350 CE. Further south, as far as the mouth of the Indus river, the Sasanians exerted some sort of control or influence, as suggested by the Sasanian coinage of Sindh. It is probable that the Sasanian expansion in India, which put an end to the remnants of Kushan rule, was also made in part at the expense of the Western Satraps.

Conquered by the Guptas (c. 335–415 CE)

Central India conquered by Samudragupta (r. 336–380 CE)
The Central Indian region around Vidisha/ Sanchi and Eran had been occupied by a Saka ruler named Sridharavarman, who his known from the Kanakerha inscription at Sanchi, and another inscription with his Naga general at Eran. At Eran, it seems that Sridharavarman's inscription is succeeded by a monument and an inscription by Gupta Empire Samudragupta (r.336-380 CE), established "for the sake of augmenting his fame", who may therefore have ousted Sridharavarman's Sakas in his campaigns to the West. Sridharavarman is probably the "Saka" ruler mentioned in the Allahabad pillar inscription of Samudragupta, as having "paid homage" to the Gupta Emperor, forced to "self-surrender, offering (their own) daughters in marriage and a request for the administration of their own districts and provinces".

Gujarat campaign of Ramagupta 

Rudrasimha III seems to have been the last of the Western Satrap rulers. A fragment from the Natya-darpana mentions that the Gupta king Ramagupta, the elder brother of Chandragupta II, decided to expand his kingdom by attacking the Western Satraps in Gujarat.

The campaign soon took a turn for the worse and the Gupta army was trapped. The Saka king, Rudrasimha III, demanded that Ramagupta hand over his wife Dhruvadevi in exchange for peace. To avoid the ignominy, the Guptas decided to send Madhavasena, a courtesan and a beloved of Chandragupta, disguised as the queen. However, Chandragupta changed the plan and himself went to the Saka King disguised as the queen. He then killed Rudrasimha and later his own brother, Ramagupta. Dhruvadevi was then married to Chandragupta.

Conquests of Chandragupta II (r. 380–415 CE)

The Western Satraps were eventually conquered by emperor Chandragupta II. Inscriptions of a victorious Chandragupta II in the year 412-413 CE can be found on the railing near the Eastern Gateway of the Great Stupa in Sanchi.

The Gupta ruler Skandagupta (455-467 CE) is known for a long inscription where he describes himself as "the ruler of the earth" on a large rock at Junagadh, in Gujarat, next to the older inscriptions of Ashoka and Rudradaman I, confirming the Gupta hold on the western regions.

Following these conquests, the silver coins of the Gupta kings Chandragupta II and his son Kumaragupta I adopted the Western Satrap design (itself derived from the Indo-Greeks) with bust of the ruler and pseudo-Greek inscription on the obverse, and a royal eagle (Garuda, the dynastic symbol of the Guptas) replacing the chaitya hill with star and crescent on the reverse.

The campaigns of Chandragupta II brought an end to nearly four centuries of Saka rule on the subcontinent. This period also corresponds to the wane of the very last Kushan rulers in the Punjab and the arrival of the Kidarite Huns, the first Huna invaders from the steppes of Central Asia. Less than a century later, the Alchon Huns in turn invaded northern India, bringing an end to the Gupta Empire and the Classical period of India.

Coinage
The Kshatrapas have a very rich and interesting coinage. It was based on the coinage of the earlier Indo-Greek Kings, with Greek or pseudo-Greek legend and stylized profiles of royal busts on the obverse. The reverse of the coins, however, is original and typically depict a thunderbolt and an arrow, and later, a chaitya or three-arched hill and river symbol with a crescent and the sun, within a legend in Brahmi. These coins are very informative, since they record the name of the King, of his father, and the date of issue, and have helped clarify the early history of India.

Regnal dates

From the reigns of Jivadaman and Rudrasimha I, the date of minting of each coin, reckoned in the Saka era, is usually written on the obverse behind the king's head in Brahmi numerals, allowing for a quite precise datation of the rule of each king. This is a rather uncommon case in Indian numismatics. Some, such as the numismat R.C Senior considered that these dates might correspond to the much earlier Azes era instead.

Also the father of each king is systematically mentioned in the reverse legends, which allows reconstruction of the regnal succession.

Languages
Kharoshthi, a script in use in more northern territories (area of Gandhara), is employed together with the Brahmi script and the Greek script on the first coins of the Western Satraps, but is finally abandoned from the time of Chastana. From that time, only the Brahmi script would remain, together with the pseudo-Greek script on the facing, to write the Prakrit language employed by the Western satraps. Occasionally, the legends are in Sanskrit instead.

The coins of Nahapana bear the Greek script legend "PANNIΩ IAHAPATAC NAHAΠANAC", transliteration of the Prakrit "Raño Kshaharatasa Nahapanasa": "In the reign of Kshaharata Nahapana". The coins of Castana also have a readable legend "PANNIΩ IATPAΠAC CIASTANCA", transliteration of the Prakrit "Raño Kshatrapasa Castana": "In the reign of the Satrap Castana". After these two rulers, the legend in Greek script becomes denaturated, and seems to lose all signification, only retaining an aesthetic value. By the 4th century, the coins of Rudrasimha II exhibit the following type of meaningless legend in corrupted Greek script: "...ΛIOΛVICIVIIIΛ...".

Influences

The coins of the Kshatrapas were also very influential and imitated by neighbouring or later dynasties, such as the Satavahanas, and the Guptas. Silver coins of the Gupta kings Chandragupta II and his son Kumaragupta I adopted the Western Satrap design (itself derived from the Indo-Greeks) with bust of the ruler and pseudo-Greek inscription on the obverse, and a royal eagle (Garuda, the dynastic symbol of the Guptas) replacing the chaitya hill with star and crescent on the reverse.

The Western Satrap coin design was also adopted by the subsequent dynasty of the Traikutakas (388–456) or the Maitrakas (475–776).

Monuments
Sudarshan Lake of the Satrap period is mentioned in major rock edicts of Junagadh but no trace of it remains. Six inscription-stones called Lashtis of 1st century were recovered from a hillock near Andhau village in the Khavda region of Kutch and were moved to the Kutch Museum in Bhuj. They are the earliest dated monuments of the Satrap period and were erected in the time of Rudradaman I.

The large number of stone inscriptions from Kutch and Saurastra as well as hundreds of coins throughout Gujarat are found belonging to the Satrap period. The earlier caves at Sana, Junagadh, Dhank, Talaja, Sidhasar, Prabhas Patan and Ranapar in the Barada Hills are mostly plain and austere in looks except some carvings in the Bava Pyara Caves of Junagadh. They are comparable to Andhra-Satrap period caves in Deccan. As they have almost no carvings, the determination of their date and chronology is difficult. The Uparkot Caves of Junagadh and the Khambhalida Caves belong to the later years of the Satraps. The stupas excavated at Boria and Intwa near Junagadh belonged to the Satrap period. The stupa excavated at Shamlaji probably belonged to this period or to the Gupta period.

Contribution to Sanskrit epigraphy

In what has been described as "the great linguistical paradox of India", Sanskrit inscriptions first appeared much later than Prakrit inscriptions, although Prakrit is considered as a descendant of the Sanskrit language. This is because Prakrit, in its multiple variants, had been favoured since the time of the influential Edicts of Ashoka (circa 250 BCE).

Besides a few examples from the 1st century BCE, most of the early Sanskrit inscriptions date to the time of the Indo-Scythian rulers, either the Northern Satraps around Mathura for the earliest ones, or, slightly later, the closely related Western Satraps in western and central India. It is thought that they became promoters of Sanskrit as a way to show their attachment to Indian culture: according to Salomon "their motivation in promoting Sanskrit was presumably a desire to establish themselves as legitimate Indian or at least Indianized rulers and to curry the favor of the educated Brahmanical elite".

In western India, the first known inscription in Sanskrit appears to have been made by Ushavadata, son-in-law of the Western Satrap ruler Nahapana, at the front of Cave n°10 in the Nasik Caves. The inscription dates to the early 2nd century CE, and has hybrid features.

The Junagadh rock inscription of Western Satraps ruler Rudradaman I (c. 150 AD, Gujarat) is the first long inscription in fairly standard Sanskrit that has survived into the modern era. It represents a turning point in Sanskrit epigraphy, states Salomon, being "the first extensive record in the poetic style" in "more or less standard Sanskrit". The Rudradaman inscription is "not pure classical Sanskrit", but with few epic-vernacular Sanskrit exceptions, it approaches high classical Sanskrit. It is important because it is likely the prototype of the extensive Sanskrit inscriptions of the Gupta Empire era. These inscriptions are also in the Brāhmī script.
During the reign of Rudradaman, circa 150 CE, it is also known that the Greek writer Yavanesvara translated the Yavanajataka from Greek to Sanskrit, for "the use of those who could not speak Greek", a translation which became an authority for all later astrology works in India.

The spread of the usage of Sanskrit inscriptions to the south can also probably be attributed to the influence of the Western Satraps, who were in close relation with southern Indian rulers: according to Salomon "a Nagarjunakonda memorial pillar inscription of the time of King Rudrapurusadatta attests to a marital alliance between the Western Ksatrapas and the Iksvaku rulers of Nagarjunakonda". The Nagarjunakonda inscriptions are the earliest substantial South Indian Sanskrit inscriptions, probably from the late 3rd-century to early 4th-century CE. These inscriptions are related to Buddhism and to the Shaivism tradition of Hinduism, and parts of them reflect both standard Sanskrit and hybridized Sanskrit. An earlier hybrid Sanskrit inscription found on Amaravati slab is dated to the late 2nd-century, while a few later ones include Sanskrit inscriptions along with Prakrit inscriptions related to Hinduism and Buddhism. After the 3rd-century CE, Sanskrit inscriptions dominate and many have survived.

Possible vassalage to the Kushans

It is still unclear whether the Western Satraps were independent rulers or vassals of the Kushan Empire (30–375 CE). The continued use of the word "Satrap" on their coin would suggest a recognized subjection to a higher ruler, possibly the Kushan emperor.

Also, a statue of Chastana was found in Mathura at the Temple of Mat together with the famous statues of Vima Kadphises and Kanishka. The statue has the inscription "Shastana" (Middle Brahmi script:  Sha-sta-na). This also would suggest at least alliance and friendship, if not vassalage. Finally Kanishka claims in the Rabatak inscription that his power extends to Ujjain, the classical capital of the Western Satrap realm. This combined with the presence of the Chastana statue side by side with Kanishka would also suggest Kushan alliance with the Western Satraps.

Finally, following the period of the "Northern Satraps" who ruled in the area of Mathura, the "Great Satrap" Kharapallana and the "Satrap" Vanaspara are known from an inscription in Sarnath to have been feudatories of the Kushans.

Generally, the position taken by modern scholarship is that the Western Satraps were vassals of the Kushans, at least in the early period until Rudradaman I conquered the Yaudheyas, who are usually thought to be Kushan vassals. The question is not considered perfectly settled.

Main rulers

Kshaharata dynasty
 Yapirajaya
 Hospises
 Higaraka
 Abhiraka (Aubhirakes)
 Bhumaka (?–119) 
 Nahapana (119–124) 
 Viceroy Ushavadata

Bhadramukhas or Kardamaka dynasty
Family of Chastana:
 Chastana (c. 78-130) , son of Ysāmotika
 Jayadaman,  son of Chastana
 Rudradaman I (c. 130–150) , son of Jayadaman 
 Damajadasri I (170–175) 
 Jivadaman (178-181, d. 199) 
 Rudrasimha I (180–188, d. 197) 
 Rudrasimha I (restored) (191–197) 
 Satyadaman (197-198) 
 Jivadaman (restored) (197–199) 
 Rudrasena I (200–222) 
 Prthivisena (222) 
 Samghadaman (222–223) 
 Damasena (223–232) 
 Damajadasri II (232–239)  with
 Viradaman (234–238) 
 Isvaradatta (236–239) 
 Yasodaman I (239) 
 Vijayasena (239–250) 
 Damajadasri III (251–255) 
 Rudrasena II (255–277) 
 Visvasimha (277–282) 
 Bhartrdaman (282–295) 
 Visvasena (293–304) 
Family of Rudrasimha II:
 Rudrasimha II (304–348) , son of Lord (Svami) Jivadaman, with
 Yasodaman II (317–332) 
 Rudradaman II (332–348) No coins known
 (Sridharavarman (339-368)  No coins known
 Rudrasena III (348–380) 
 Simhasena (380–384/5) 
 Rudrasena IV (382–388) 
 Rudrasimha III (388–415)

Descendants
The Abhiras called themselves Sakas and were descended from feudatories of the Western Satraps.

See also
History of India
Indo-Greek Kingdom
Indo-Scythians
Indo-Parthians
Kushan Empire
Rulers of Malwa

Notes

References

Rapson, "A Catalogue of Indian coins in the British Museum. Andhras etc."
John Rosenfield, "The dynastic art of the Kushans", 1976
Claudius Ptolemy, "The geography", Translated and edited by Edward Luther Stevenson, Dover Publications Inc., New York,

Sources

External links
 History of the Andhras, Prasad 1988 With many references to Western Satrap rule
Online catalogue of Western Kshatrapa coins
Coins of the Western Kshatrapas 
The Kshatrapas in Nasik 
The Origins of the Indian Coinage Tradition at Academia.edu

 
States and territories established in the 30s
States and territories disestablished in the 5th century
History of Pakistan
History of Rajasthan
Dynasties of India
Satraps
History of Gujarat
Ujjain